The Rio Vermelho Microregion is a geographical region in central Goiás state, Brazil.  The most important city is Goiás, also known as Goiás Velho, the only World Heritage Site in the state of Goiás. It takes its name from the Vermelho River, a tributary of the Araguaia River that flows through the region.  A region of varied geography with rugged terrain in the south and low watery lands in the north.

Municipalities 
The microregion consists of the following municipalities:

Araguapaz--7,482
Aruanã--6,476 
Britânia--5,073
Faina--6,918
Goiás--24,472 
Itapirapuã--8,208
Jussara--18,814 
Matrinchã--4,325
Santa Fé de Goiás--4,594
Population figures are from 2007 and are from Sepin

See also
List of municipalities in Goiás
Microregions of Goiás

References

Microregions of Goiás